The Greenland Cup was an association football friendly knock-out tournament controlled by the Football Association of Greenland. The Greenland National Football Team competed as a regular in its short-lived running. Despite being the representing country, Greenland never won the Greenland Cup. It ran from 1980 to 1984, with 3 tournaments overall.

It was contested by the Greenland, Faroe Islands and Iceland senior male national teams who, at the time, were not affiliated with FIFA. The Faroe Islands and Iceland were the only teams to win the tournament. Both countries have since gone on to become UEFA and FIFA members.

Overview 
The Greenland Cup tournament was created in 1980. The tournament used knock-out rules or a round robin system. The tournament matches did not have extra time, nor did they go to a penalty shootout. Matches were replayed if drawn, as in the 1983 final.

The first tournament was held in Sauðárkrókur, Akureyri and Húsavík,  Iceland. The hosts beat the Faroe Islands 2–1 in the first match, on 30 June 1980. Greenland lost their first game 6–0 to the Faroes, and, in the last match, Iceland's national team beat Greenland 4-1 – Iceland's Marteinn Geirsson, Páll Ólafsson, Lárus Guðmundsson, and Guðmundur Steinsson scored a goal each, however, Greenland forward Kristofer Ludvigsen scored the last goal.

Two years after the first edition, 1983 saw the second Greenland Cup. The match for the cup between Greenland and the Faroe Islands ended in a 0–0 draw. The match was then replayed several days later. The rematch saw the Faroe Islands beating Greenland in a close 3–2 victory in the Greenland capital city of Nuuk.

The third and last Greenland Cup tournament was in 1984, when Iceland made a comeback to the tournament. Greenland lost to both the Faroe Islands and Iceland in 1-0 results, putting Greenland in third place. The Faroe Islands and Iceland met in the final, sharing the cup after the match came to a draw. After this tournament, the Greenland Cup was abolished due to a lack of quality from Greenland's national team. The Football Association of Greenland's president, Lars Lundblad, mentioned the interest in reviving the Greenland Cup after the improvement of Greenland's team and would be possible if Greenland joins FIFA.

Winners 

 The first 1983 Greenland Cup final ended in a 0–0 result between Faroe Islands and Greenland, so the match was replayed.

1980

1983

1984

Post-tournament friendly

Goalscorers

4 goals
 Asmund Nolsøe

1 goal

 Kristian Petersen
 Samuel Vagalid
 Niels Davidson
 Eydun Dahl Christiansen
 Aksel Højgaard
 Kristoffer Ludvigsen
 Kresten Kreutzmann
 Lars Sandgreen
 Larus Godmundsson
 Paul Olfsson
 Martinus Gerisson
 Godmund Steirsson

See also 

Association football in Greenland 
Greenlandic Football Championship
List of association football competitions
Sport in Greenland
 Island games
 FIFI Wild Cup

External links 
 RSSSF - Greenland Cups 1980–84

References 

Football competitions in Greenland
Greenland national football team
Greenland-related lists